Timothy Robert DeKay (born June 12, 1963) is an American actor. He starred in the USA Network series White Collar (2009–2014)

Early life
Tim DeKay was born June 12, 1963, to Jim DeKay and Jill Vaughn in Lansing, New York, where he and his brother Jamey grew up. He attended Lansing High School, approximately nine miles from Ithaca. Growing up, DeKay enjoyed athletics, having played both varsity basketball and baseball, the latter of which is a generational tradition in his family. He also enjoyed the arts and performed in his high school's production of Oliver!. DeKay attended Le Moyne College to study business and philosophy, where he also played baseball, eventually deciding to pursue a career in theater.

DeKay planned for a career in business or law and graduated with a bachelor's degree in business administration in 1985. However, he realized that he wanted to work in theater instead. After taking a few courses in directing at Syracuse University, DeKay attended Rutgers University, where he received a Master of Fine Arts degree and met his wife, actress Elisa Taylor.

Career
DeKay has performed in plays both on Broadway and off, including Ridiculous Fraud at the McCarter Theatre, Billy Budd at the Circle in the Square Theatre, Someone to Watch Over Me with the Denver Theatre Company, The Merchant of Venice on the Hartford Stage, and the national tour of The Lion in Winter. In 2009, he was both director and producer of the short film This Monday. It was included in several short film festivals, including Cannes Short Film Corner and the Palm Springs International Festival of Short Films.

His first onscreen acting job was as corporation head Larry Deon on seaQuest 2032. DeKay was a cast member of Party of Five from 1997 to 1999, Carnivàle from 2003 to 2005, and Tell Me You Love Me in 2007. He also appeared as Dean Stewart in the gay-themed comedy/drama film Big Eden in 2000. DeKay appeared in two episodes of Seinfeld: "The Soul Mate" and "The Bizarro Jerry", as Elaine's boyfriend, Kevin. He would work with Julia Louis-Dreyfus again in The New Adventures of Old Christine, playing a temperamental boyfriend of Louis-Dreyfus's character in a three-episode story arc. DeKay has also guest-starred on several other TV series, including Friends, CSI, My Name Is Earl, NCIS, Scrubs, and Chuck.

In 2009, he began starring in the USA Network comedy–drama White Collar as FBI agent Peter Burke. DeKay made his directorial debut in the episode "Stealing Home", which premiered in 2012. He played Duvall Pritchard in Fox Television's 2016 sci-fi drama series Second Chance.

DeKay is a member of the Actors Studio. He taught as an adjunct professor at the University of Southern California.

Personal life
DeKay and his wife, actress Elisa Taylor, reside in Los Angeles, California. They have a daughter, Danna, and a son, Jamis.

In May 2010, he returned to Le Moyne College as the commencement speaker and was awarded the degree of Doctor of Humane Letters honoris causa.

Filmography

Film

Television

References

External links

 
 Team DeKay, Tim DeKay fansite
 VIdeo of Tim Dekay's 2010 Commencement speech at LeMoyne College via YouTube

1963 births
Living people
American male film actors
American male television actors
American male stage actors
Male actors from New York (state)
Le Moyne College alumni
Le Moyne Dolphins baseball players
People from Lansing, New York